Smrdáky is a spa village and municipality in Senica District in the Trnava Region of western Slovakia.

History
In historical records the village was first mentioned in 1436.

Geography
The municipality lies at an altitude of 241 metres and covers an area of 4.725 km². It has a population of about 603 people.

References

External links

 Smrdaky.sk - interactive map, stories, experiences and culture in spa village Smrdaky.
 Official page

Villages and municipalities in Senica District